Ogrons are a fictional extraterrestrial race from the British science fiction television series Doctor Who.

Ogrons are low-intelligence, ape-like hominids who live in scattered communities on the rocky planet Ograviss, on the outer fringes of the Milky Way, far from the central spaceways. The dominant lifeform on their home planet is a giant slug-like lizard named the Eater, which preys on and is prayed to by the Ogrons.

Ogrons are hired mercenaries. Those who have employed their services include the Daleks and the Master when he was working for the Daleks. On some human planets, Ogrons are employed as police officers, usually led by a mentally augmented leader.

Appearances
In Day of the Daleks in an alternate 22nd century ruled by the Daleks, the Ogrons are used as police forces. At the end of the serial, Daleks and Ogrons travel back to attack a peace conference and make sure that their version of history remains intact. This force is destroyed by a bomb.

In Frontier in Space, set in 2540, the Ogrons are used by the Master to attack spaceships of both Earth and Draconia, in an attempt to start a war between the two forces, so that the Daleks can conquer the galaxy. This serial shows the Ogrons' home planet.

As well as the original Doctor Who television series, they appear in the Virgin Missing Adventures novel The Romance of Crime by Gareth Roberts, the New Adventures novels Shakedown and Mean Streets, both by Terrance Dicks, and the BBC Books novels Mission: Impractical by David A. McIntee, Interference by Lawrence Miles, and Warmonger by Terrence Dicks. In these books, it is explained that the Ogrons are only able to fly spacecraft via their powerful sense of mimicry. Interference states that Ogron speech also uses subsonic frequencies and that they are more intelligent than they appear to be from their audible speech alone. A mentally augmented Ogron named Garshak appears as a supporting character in both Shakedown and Mean Streets, first as police chief for the corrupt megacity on Megarra and later as a private detective. In Warmonger, a group of thirty Ogrons become the Doctor's personal bodyguards when he adopts the alias of "Supremo" while leading a large alliance of alien races against the renegade Time Lord Morbius, as he recognised that choosing bodyguards from any of his other alien allies would send an unintended message that he favoured one race over the others while assigning the task to individuals of each race would make them compete against each other, while the Ogrons were a small enough group that they could appear to have been specially chosen for the duty.

In The Romance of Crime and Mission: Impractical, the Ogron homeworld is given the name Braah. Because of rapid changes in Braah's climate, the evolutionary path the Ogrons were on got confused, resulting in them being a mixture of primate and carnivore instincts. The Virgin New Adventure So Vile a Sin named it as Orestes. According to the Dalek Survival Guide, written by various Doctor Who novelists, the Ogrons have never named their planet, and a committee has proposed the name "the Ogron Planet".

The Ogrons also appear, again in the employ of the Daleks, in the Big Finish Productions audio drama Return of the Daleks.

The Ogrons, still under Dalek employ, return in Big Finish story Planet of the Ogrons. In this story it is revealed that the Daleks never originally used the Ogrons during the events of Day or Frontier. The Eighth Doctor (Paul McGann) is able to remember two versions of both events, with and without Ogron involvement. This is revealed to be because of the Time War as a result of Daleks interfering in the past. The story also features a character named Doctor Ogron (Jon Culshaw) initially believed to be a future incarnation of the Doctor, but who turns out to be a result of Dalek genetic experiments to create augmented Ogrons using Time Lord DNA.

Television
Day of the Daleks (1 January – 22 January 1972)
Carnival of Monsters (27 January – 17 February 1973)
Frontier in Space (24 February – 31 March 1973)
Dimensions in Time (1993)
Novels
The Romance of Crime
Mission: Impractical
Shakedown
Interference
Warmonger
Mean Streets
Audio drama
Return of the Daleks (released December 2006)
Planet of the Ogrons (released July 2018)
Computer games
Dalek Attack (1992)

References

External links

Doctor Who races
Daleks
Fictional mercenaries